With their military mission and extensive financial resources, the Knights Templar funded a large number of building projects around Europe and the Holy Land, many structures remain standing today.

Middle East

In the Kingdom of Jerusalem, now in Israel and Southern Lebanon: 
 Al-Aqsa Mosque on Temple Mount, Jerusalem, 1119–1187
 , built around 1110 by Hugues de Payens
  (Khirbet el-Burj) near Tantura, 12th century to 1291 with interruption in the late 1180s
 , 1149–1187
 , 1150–1179
 La Fève, now Merhavia, 1160s to 1187
 , 1166–1187
 Castle of Maldoim or Adumim (Rouge Cisterne, Arabic Qal'at ad-Damm) near Khan al-Ahmar, built ca. 1170
 Burgata inland from Netanya, until 1189
 Tel Yokneam (Caymont or Cain Mons) southeast of Haifa, ca. 1262–1265
 Yalo (Castrum Arnaldi) southeast of Ramla, 1179–1187
 A fortress in nearby Latrun, 12th century
 Safed, 1168–1188 and 1240–1266
  near Safed, 1178–1179
 , east of Jerusalem
 Tell es-Safi (Blanchegarde)
 Properties in Acre, Israel, including the still-extant Templar Tunnel
 Château Pèlerin (fr. "Pilgrim Castle"), also known as Atlit Castle, 1218–1291
 Sidon, 1260–1268
 Beaufort Castle, Lebanon, 1260–1268
Jordan River Project, Israel, 1955 - 
Jordan River Project, Jordan, 1955 - 
In the County of Tripoli, now in Northern Lebanon and coastal Syria: 
 Chastel Blanc, 1117–1271
 Tartus (Tortosa) and its fortress, Templars headquarters 1152–1188 and fortress held until 1291, including the Cathedral of Our Lady of Tortosa
 Areimeh Castle, from the early 1150s to 1187 with interruption 1171–1177
 Arwad island (Ruad), occupied in 1300–1302
In the Principality of Antioch, now in Turkey: 
 Roche-Guillaume, 12th century–1203 and 1237–1298
 Trapessac, in the 12th century until 1188
 Bagras (Gaston), 1153–1189 and 1216–1268
 Roche de Roissel, from the 12th century to 1268
The Templars also held commandries in Ascalon, Jaffa, Tyre, Laodicea, Rhosus, Alexandretta, and Ayas.

Cyprus
 The Templars briefly owned the entire island of Cyprus in 1191–1192, preceding the establishment of the Kingdom of Cyprus
 Gastria Castle, 1210–1279
 Kolossi Castle, 1306–1313
 Fortresses in Germasogeia and Khirokitia
Also commandries in Nicosia, Famagusta, Limassol, Paphos, and Psimolofou, including the Twin Church of the Templars and Hospitallers in Famagusta

France

 Templar fortress of Paris, now destroyed.
 Commandry of Coulommiers, France
 Commandry of Avalleur, in Bar-sur-Seine
 Commandry of Saint-Blaise, Hyères
 La Rochelle, Charente Maritime, France
 Chapelle des Templiers de Metz - 12th-century Gothic chapel with octagonal plan and various paintings.
 Commandry of Libdeau, Toul - 12th-century Gothic chapel with rectangular plan and traces of paintings.
 Commandry of Sergeac
 Commandry of Dognon, Blanzac-Porcheresse - 12th-century chapel with rectangular plan and various paintings.
 Commandry of Sainte-Eulalie-de-Cernon
 Commandry of Richerenches
 La Couvertoirade, Aveyron - A castle, commandry and fortifications
 Commandry of Celles
 Commandry of Arville, now restored with a museum of Templar history.

Portugal

 Castle of Almourol
 Castelo Branco
 Castle of Idanha
 Castle of Monsanto
 Castle of Penha Garcia
 Castle of Pombal
 Castle of Soure - received and reconstructed in March 1128, was the first castle of the Knights Templar.
Quinta da Regaleira
 Old town of Tomar, including the Castle, the Convent of the Order of Christ and the Church of Santa Maria do Olival

Spain

Crown of Castile and Leon 
 Castle of Montalbán in San Martín de Montalbán, province of Toledo
 Castle of Villalba in Cebolla, Province of Toledo
 Castle of San Servando, in Toledo
 The Templar House, Toledo
 Iglesia Veracruz in Segovia
 Castillo de los Templarios in Ponferrada
 Castle of Alcañices, in Zamora

Crown of Aragon
 Peniscola Castle
 Castle of Castellote
 Castle of Miravet
 Castle of Barbens
 Castle of Gardeny, in Lérida
 Commandry of Palau, in Palau-solità i Plegamans
 Castle of Xivert in Valencia
 Castle of Cintruénigo: the birth of a 12th-century gilda around the encomienda of Novillas, in the Valley of the middle Ebro, delimited by Queiles and Huecha, as a point of connection between the three kingdoms of Pamplona-Navarra, Aragon and Castile.

United Kingdom

England

Sorted by county
 Temple Church, Bristol, Bristol
 Denny Abbey, Cambridgeshire
 Temple Church, Temple, Bodmin Moor, Cornwall
 St Michael's Mount, Cornwall
 Temple Sowerby, Cumbria
 Cressing Temple, Essex
 Little Maplestead, Essex
 Garway Church, Herefordshire
 St Mary The Virgin church, Welsh Newton, Herefordshire
 Church of St Mary the Virgin in Baldock, Hertfordshire
 Temple Dinsley, Hertfordshire
 The Manor of Temple Ewell, Kent
 Rothley Temple (Rothley Preceptory), Rothley, Leicestershire 
 Eagle Hall Lincolnshire 
 South Witham Lincolnshire 
 Temple Bruer, Lincolnshire
 The Temple including Temple Church, London
 Inner Temple
 Middle Temple
 Temple Mills, Stratford, London
 Temple Cowton, North Yorkshire
 Westerdale Preceptory, North Yorkshire
 Temple Cowley, Oxfordshire
 Templars Square, Oxfordshire
 Cameley and Temple Cloud, Somerset
 Templecombe, Somerset
 Keele, Staffordshire
 Temple Balsall, Warwickshire
 Temple End, Harbury, Warwickshire
 Church of St Mary the Blessed Virgin, Sompting. West Sussex
 St Mary's Church, Shipley, West Sussex
 Temple Newsam, West Yorkshire
 Temple Farm, Rockley, Wiltshire

Scotland
 Temple, Midlothian
Castle Rainy and Templars' House, Turriff, Aberdeenshire
 Darvel, East Ayrshire

Wales
 Llanmadoc Church Gower - gift from the Duchess of Warwick

Ireland
 Templetown, County Wexford
 Clontarf Castle (Templar Preceptory), County Dublin
 Baldongan Church (in-ruins), Skerries, County Dublin
 Temple House, Ballymote, County Sligo

Croatia
 Cesargrad (Kayersperg)
 Brckovljani,
 Fortress of Klis,
 Glogovnica
 Gora, Croatia
 Gornji Slatinik
 Hrvatska Dubica,
 Lovčić
 Našice,
 Nova Ves,
 Rassecha – Nova Rača
 Senj,
 Zdelja village near Virje
 Vižinada
 Vrana Fortress,

Italy
See a detailed list at 
 Castello della Magione, Poggibonsi
 San Pietro alla Magione, Siena
 Valvisciolo Abbey, Sermoneta
 Abbey of St. Michael in Montescaglioso
 Templars' Tower at San Felice Circeo (from 1240 to 1259)

Other countries

 Haneffe, Belgium 
 Villers-le-Temple, Belgium
 , Czech Republic
 Tempelhof, Germany
 Chwarszczany, Poland
 Grad na Goričkem, Slovenija

See also
 List of Knights Hospitaller sites
 Ordensburg

References

List of Knights Templar sites
Crusader castles
Knights Templar
Knights Templar sites